Radiant Black is an American comic book series published by Image Comics and written by Kyle Higgins and drawn by Marcelo Costa. The series began publication around February 2021 and is currently ongoing. It is also a part of Image's Massive-Verse.

Synopsis 
The series follows Nathan Burnett, who discovers and unlocks the ethereal, cosmic Radiant, and Nathan's best friend Marshall, who takes over for Nathan as Radiant Black following an incident that leaves Nathan hospitalized.

Characters

Nathan Burnett
Nathan is a struggling writer who is imbued with the power to become the first Radiant Black.

Marshall
Nathan's longtime best friend who becomes the second Radiant Black in issue 4.

Eva
An internet gaming streamer who becomes the Radiant Pink, a radiant who can teleport. She later headlines her own series.

Satomi Sone
A middle school teacher who becomes the Radiant Red, a radiant who can absorb material and bulk up in size. She later headlines her own five-issue miniseries.

Wendall George
The Radiant Yellow.

Shift
A recurring foe and leader of his own syndicate. He is the main antagonist of the series.

Prints

Issues

Collected editions

Reception 
Daniel Gehen from Comics Bulletin wrote "Radiant Black #1 lays the foundation for what may be the best new superhero since Robert Kirkman's Invincible". Matthew Aguilar of ComicBook.com liked the main character.

Accolades

References

External links 
 Official Website
 Black Market Narrative Website

2021 comics debuts
Image Comics titles